Payson Center for Success High School (PCSHS) is an alternative public high school located in the rural town of Payson, Arizona. The school is one of two high schools within Payson Unified School District. PCSHS accommodates grades 9–12, and in 2016–17, the school had a student body of 103. The school's colors are green and yellow and the teams are collectively called the Dragons.

References

Public high schools in Arizona
Schools in Gila County, Arizona